Božidar Ðurašković (born 27 December 1924) is a former Yugoslav middle distance runner who competed in the 1952 Summer Olympics. He was born in Ulcinj.

References

External links
 

1924 births
Possibly living people
People from Ulcinj
Yugoslav male middle-distance runners
Montenegrin male long-distance runners
Yugoslav male steeplechase runners
Yugoslav male long-distance runners
Olympic athletes of Yugoslavia
Athletes (track and field) at the 1952 Summer Olympics
Mediterranean Games gold medalists for Yugoslavia
Mediterranean Games medalists in athletics
Athletes (track and field) at the 1951 Mediterranean Games